Pirouz Ghorbani (born February 1, 1978) is a retired Iranian football defender, who played for Saba Qom in IPL. He usually played as a defender.

Club career 
Pirouz Ghorbani played for Esteghlal F.C. since he was 16 alongside teammates Amir Hossein Sadeqi and Vahid Talebloo.

Club career statistics

 Assist Goals

International career 
He made his debut for the Iran national football team in a friendly match against UAE in January 2007. After the injury of Hadi Aghili in 2008 he was called up again against UAE and played the match.

Honours
Iran's Premier Football League
Winner: 2
2005/06 with Esteghlal
2008/09 with Esteghlal
Runner up: 1
2003/04 with Esteghlal
Hazfi Cup
Winners:1
2008 with Esteghlal
Runner up: 1
2004 with Esteghlal

References

Iranian footballers
Iran international footballers
Association football defenders
Esteghlal F.C. players
1978 births
Living people
Sanat Mes Kerman F.C. players
Saipa F.C. players
Rah Ahan players
Persian Gulf Pro League players
21st-century Iranian people